Dan Shaul (born December 13, 1968) is an American politician. He is a member of the Missouri House of Representatives, having served since 2015. He is a member of the Republican party.

References

Living people
Republican Party members of the Missouri House of Representatives
1968 births
21st-century American politicians